Sooty woodpecker may refer to:

Northern sooty woodpecker, endemic to Luzon, Marinduque, Catanduanes, and the Polillo Islands in the Philippines
Southern sooty woodpecker, endemic to Mindanao, Leyte, Biliran, and Samar in the Philippines

Birds by common name